Cameron Buchan (born 3 December 1992) is a Scottish rower who competes for Leander Club. He competed for British Rowing at the 2017 Poznan and Belgrade World Cups.

Rowing career
Buchan began rowing at Kent School during his first year. He originally played basketball for the Great Britain U20 squad, later swapping to rowing. He received a scholarship offer from Northeastern University. In 2014 and 2015, he represented Great Britain in the under-23 Men's Eight.

In 2017, Buchan represented Great Britain at Poznan and Belgrade in the World Rowing Cups. On both occasions he competed in the Eight, and placed 3rd and 2nd respectively. He also competed at the 2017 World Rowing championships at Sarasota-Bradenton, where he competed in the Eight, and came first in the B final.

Personal life
Buchan was born in Dunipace, Scotland on 3 December 1992. He attended Denny High School and Kent School. While attending Northeastern University, he majored in business.

Buchan is the founder of Yam Squad, an online clothing and rowing company. He has a rowing-themed YouTube channel, and is known for his sayings "Food is Fuel", “Ahh Yeah”, and “Yamboghini”.

References

External links
 Cameron Buchan

1992 births
Living people
Scottish male rowers
Kent School alumni
Northeastern University alumni
People educated at Denny High School
People from Denny, Falkirk
Sportspeople from Falkirk (council area)